The James Reed Building or the Reed Smith Building is a historic building in Pittsburgh. It was constructed in 1902. It is in the Beaux-Arts architecture style.

For many years, the primary tenant had been Reed Smith law firm. The buildings namesake is one of Reed Smiths founders, James Hay Reed.

Reed Smith bought the nine-story building in 1984 for $5.82 million as 435 Sixth Ave Associates. In 2007 Reed Smith decided to relocate its corporate headquarters to Three PNC Plaza and sell the building, which had a market value of $16.78 million. The downtown Pittsburgh office vacancy rate at the time was 20%, driving down the value of the building. In October 2008, the building was purchased by Mika Realty Group of Los Angeles  for $6.5 million.  Mika Realty, owned by Michael Kamen and Gerson Fox, purchased the building under the name 600 William Penn Partners LLC. Kamen and Fox also purchased the nearby Union Trust Building 6 months prior. 

In 2009, Reed Smith law firm moved its corporate headquarters to Three PNC Plaza. Mika Realty was never able to find a tenant to replace Reed Smith, the building remained vacant, which led to bankruptcy in 2011. PMC Property Group purchased the building in September 2012 for $5.5 million in a U.S. Bankruptcy Court auction in Los Angeles.

The building was redeveloped into a 249-room Hotel Monaco, opened in January 2015.

References

Beaux-Arts architecture in Pennsylvania
Skyscraper office buildings in Pittsburgh
Office buildings completed in 1902
Kimpton hotels
Skyscraper hotels in Pittsburgh